Belciades is a monotypic moth genus of the family Noctuidae erected by Igor Vasilii Kozhanchikov in 1950. Its only species, Belciades niveola, was first described by Victor Motschulsky in 1866. It is found in Korea and Japan.

References

Catocalinae
Monotypic moth genera